Joshua Brard (born 14 May 1986, in Dordrecht) is a former Dutch professional footballer. He played as a midfielder.

Football
Brard grew up in Hendrik-Ido-Ambacht, where he started to play football at ASWH. During his youth he also spent some time in Japan. Joshua's father, Stanley Brard, was also a professional footballer, amongst others at Feyenoord, and had found employment in Japan.

Back in the Netherlands Brard signed with Sparta in 2005 where he only made it to the bench. In the summer of 2006 FC Oss took over Brar's contract from Sparta. Here he played his 11 only games as a professional footballer. His contract was not renewed. After an internship in Japan, he played for the "amateur" sides LRC Leerdam, his youth club ASWH, for VV Capelle (2011–2013) and for VV SHO (2013).

In the 2010s he works as a project manager at a Hendrik-Ido-Ambacht firm that organizes training camps.

References

1986 births
Living people
ASWH players
Sparta Rotterdam players
Dutch footballers
Footballers from Dordrecht
Footballers from Hendrik-Ido-Ambacht
Association football midfielders
VV Capelle players